On Our Way may refer to:

 "On Our Way", a 2006 song by Christina Aguilera from Back to Basics
 "On Our Way", a 2013 song by The Royal Concept from Goldrushed